Edward Graham Lee (also known as Ted Lee) (born 1931 in Vancouver, British Columbia, Canada) is a Canadian lawyer and former diplomat.

Early life
He attended the University of British Columbia Faculty of Law (Class of 1955). His interest in international law was sparked by UBC's founding dean George F. Curtis. His 39-year career in Foreign Affairs were a result of the Dean's encouragement. He spent a year practising domestic law with Nathaniel Nemetz and Jack Austin in Vancouver, British Columbia. He found the scope of work in domestic law boring, and returned to Ottawa to continue work in international law.

Diplomatic career
While involved with the United Nations Human Rights Commission, Lee helped draft the convention against racial discrimination. Although there human rights had previously existed, this was significant because it was hard law that the state would have to comply with. He was an ambassador to South Africa when apartheid was at its worst, but also when changes were being brought about. During this time, Canada provided support, both in statesmanship and funding to help the Black community set up infrastructure. He was able to help Winnie Mandela build a kindergarten and with the fostering of good relations with Archbishop Desmond Tutu and Helen Suzman.

Diplomatic posts
His career as a diplomat involved the "Legal Division, Department of External Affairs, Ottawa, 1956. Second Secretary to Jakarta, Indonesia, 1959. Deputy Chief of Protocol, 1961. Head of the United Nations Economic and Social Affairs Section, 1961. Counsellor to London, 1965. Director of Legal Operations, 1969-71, and of Personnel Operations, 1971-73. Legal Advisor and Director General of the Bureau of Legal Affairs, 1973-75. Ambassador to Israel and High Commissioner to Cyprus, 1975. Assistant Under-Secretary for United States Affairs, 1979-82. Ambassador to South Africa and High Commissioner to Lesotho and Swaziland, and Canadian Representative to Namibia, 1982-86. Legal Advisor and Assistant Deputy Minister for Legal, Consular and Immigration Affairs, 1986-90. Ambassador to Austria, Governor of Canada to the International Atomic Energy Agency, Permanent Representative to the United Nations in Vienna and to the United Nations Industrial Development Organization, 1990-93".

Retirement
After officially retiring from his diplomatic career, he became an adjunct professor of international law at the University of Ottawa, and the president of the Canadian Council on International Law.

References

External links
 http://www.international.gc.ca/department/history-histoire/hp_search_results-en.asp?frm=person&lan=1&prsnid=215

1931 births
Ambassadors of Canada to Austria
Ambassadors of Canada to Israel
Ambassadors of Canada to South Africa
Living people
People from Vancouver
Peter A. Allard School of Law alumni
University of British Columbia alumni